We Still Kill the Old Way is a British crime drama film written by Dougie Brimson, Sacha Bennett and Gary Lawrence, directed by Sacha Bennett, and starring Ian Ogilvy, Alison Doody, Lysette Anthony and James Cosmo.

Plot
A retired East End gangster, Ritchie Archer, returns to London from Spain to investigate the violent sadistic murder of his brother, Charlie, at the hands of a local street gang called E2. In the process, Ritchie discovers that the police are deliberately delaying the case, out of incompetence, fear or both. Ritchie and his old mates gather to pay their last respects to Charlie, and then set about getting revenge. They start by abducting known associates of the gang's leader, Aaron, during which Ritchie suffers a heart attack and is taken to hospital. They use the investigating detective-inspector's daughter, Lauren, who had a short relationship with Aaron and witnessed Charlie's murder, to trick E2 into trying to kill Ritchie in his hospital bed. The street gang is subsequently ambushed, culminating in a shoot-out; a number of gang members are either incapacitated or killed, and Roy is wounded. Aaron threatens to kill Lauren if the older gang does not surrender. They do so but Ritchie and Aaron fight regardless until armed police arrive on the scene and kill Aaron.

The epilogue shows the old gangsters at the private airport, saying their goodbyes to Ritchie's helicopter when he suddenly appears at their side, mentioning  something they did "in 1969, with Charlie", Roy adds "in Turin".

Cast
Ian Ogilvy as Ritchie Archer
Alison Doody as DI Susan Taylor
Christopher Ellison as Roy
Danny-Boy Hatchard as Aaron
Lysette Anthony as Lizzie Davis
James Cosmo as Arthur Bennett
Steven Berkoff as Charlie Archer
Nathan Clarke as Dean
Tony Denham as Butch
Dani Dyer as Lauren Taylor
Nicky Henson as Jack Houghton
John Samuel Kande as Leroy
Red Madrell as DK
Anouska Mond as Carmen Archer
Sagar Radia as Maz
Adele Silva as Gemma
Elijah Baker as JB

Release

The film was released on DVD in December 2014.

Reception

Stephen Kelly of Total Film gave the film a score of two stars out of five and stated that it "plays its 'everything was much better in the old days' fantasy more as a crass cartoon than as stark social realism".

Sequel
Producer Jonathan Sothcott brings in his involvement with a sequel to the film called We Still Steal the Old Way, with Sacha Bennett returning to direct and co-write the script alongside Simon Cluett. Ian Ogilvy and the rest of the lead cast members reprised their roles, joined by Julian Glover, Patrick Bergin and Billy Murray playing the main antagonist. It was released in April 2017.

References

External links
 
 

2014 films
2014 crime drama films
Hood films
British crime drama films
British films about revenge
Films set in London
2010s English-language films
Films directed by Sacha Bennett
2010s British films